Journal of Photonics for Energy is a quarterly, online peer-reviewed scientific journal covering fundamental and applied research on the applications of photonics for renewable energy harvesting, conversion, storage, distribution, monitoring, consumption, and efficient usage, published by SPIE. The editor-in-chief is Sean Shaheen.

Abstracting and indexing
The journal is abstracted and indexed in:
 Science Citation Index Expanded
 Current Contents - Physical, Chemical & Earth Sciences
 Current Contents - Engineering, Computing & Technology
 Inspec
 Scopus
 Ei/Compendex
According to the Journal Citation Reports, the journal has a 2020 impact factor of 1.836.

References

External links
 

Optics journals
Engineering journals
SPIE academic journals
English-language journals
Publications established in 2011